Alumni Gym was a 2,000 capacity structure on the campus of Loyola University Chicago. It served as the home of the Loyola Ramblers Men's and Women's Volleyball programs, as well as the Loyola University Department of Intercollegiate Athletics. It is the former home of the Loyola Ramblers basketball team, which last played in Alumni Gym in 1996. The basketball team moved to the 5,200-seat Joseph J. Gentile Center at the beginning of the 1996–97 season. From 1924 to 1941, Loyola hosted the National Catholic Interscholastic Basketball Tournament in Alumni Gym. The facility hosted the Semifinals and Championship game of the 2005 and 2006 Midwestern Intercollegiate Volleyball Association Championship.

The final intercollegiate game at Alumni Gym was on April 27, 2011. The Loyola men's volleyball team defeated Quincy University 3–1 in the semifinals of the Midwestern Intercollegiate Volleyball Association tournament in front of an announced crowd of 424 people.

The building was demolished in the summer of 2011 to make way for a new student union on campus.

References

External links
Alumni Gym Profile at LoyolaRamblers.com

Basketball venues in Chicago
College volleyball venues in the United States
Defunct college basketball venues in the United States
Demolished sports venues in Illinois
Indoor arenas in Chicago
Loyola Ramblers basketball
Sports venues completed in 1924
Sports venues demolished in 2011
Volleyball venues in Chicago
1924 establishments in Illinois
2011 disestablishments in Illinois